Lin Wu (born February 1962) is a Chinese politician and the current CCP Secretary of Shandong province. Previously, he served as CCP Secretary of Shanxi province, Shanxi Governor, deputy governor and the chief of the CCP Organization Department of Jilin province.

Career
Lin Wu was born in Minhou County, Fujian, and graduated from Jiangxi Institute of Metallurgy (now Jiangxi University of Science and Technology). He started to work at Xiangtan Steel in 1982, and served as the Assistant manager in 1997. In 1998, he served as the General Manager of Xiangtan Steel Group.

In 2003, Lin Wu was appointed as the director of Hunan Economic and Trade Commission. Later he was appointed as the acting mayor of Loudi City in 2005, and promoted to the CPC Secretary in 2008. 

In 2011, Lin was appointed as the deputy chief of the CPC Organization Department of Hunan province. He was transferred to Jilin province, and served as the chief of the CPC Organization Department in 2016. In 2017, he was appointed as the deputy Governor of Jilin.

Lin was resigned the deputy Governor of Jilin in 2018, and appointed as the deputy Governor of Shanxi. In December 2019, he was appointed as the acting Governor.

In June 2021, Lin was appointed as the Communist Party Secretary of Shanxi.

In December 2022, Lin was appointed as the Communist Party Secretary of Shandong.

References

1962 births
Living people
People's Republic of China politicians from Fujian
Chinese Communist Party politicians from Fujian
Deputy Communist Party secretaries of Shanxi
Governors of Shanxi
Politicians from Fuzhou
Delegates to the 13th National People's Congress